Legend of a Rabbit ( Tùxiá Chuánqí), released in the United States as Legend of Kung Fu Rabbit, is a 2011 Chinese computer-animated film directed by Sun Yijun. The film features an original cast of Fan Wei, Yan Ni, Zhang Fengyi, Zhang Yishan and Pu Cunxin. In the English version, it stars the voices of Jon Heder, Tom Arnold, Rebecca Black, Michael Clarke Duncan and Claire Geare.

The film was released in 62 countries, and was the first Chinese animated feature ever to be shown internationally. The film was a box office failure in China, managing to gross CNY16.2 million compared to its CNY120 million budget. Some noted its similarity to the Kung Fu Panda film franchise.

A sequel to the film, Legend of a Rabbit: The Martial of Fire, was released in 2015.

Plot
A rabbit named Tu'er has an occupation of cooking pancakes in Beijing. The rabbit is trained by a monkey kung fu master named Laoguanzhu, so he can defeat the master's enemy, a panda named Xiongtianba.
Tu'er, surprised at this discovery, confronts  Laoguanzhu; furious at these accusations, Laoguanzhu begins to enlarge until he becomes a giant and devours Tu'er.

Cast

Production and release
Legend of a Rabbit was directed by Sun Yijun, president of animation at Beijing Film Academy. It was made over the course of three years, with a crew of 500 animators. 
The film was produced on a budget of CNY120 million, with 80% of it used for production equipment, while the rest was used for marketing. Yijun said that he was not completely satisfied with the film, but it would still get attention to the Chinese animation industry. He also said:

Legend of a Rabbit was first presented in December 2010, at a conference held in Beijing. The first teaser was released in February 2011, and a seven-minute preview was later put online in June. The film premiered at the 2011 Cannes Film Festival. It was later shown at 3,000 theaters in China, and was released in more than 80 countries, making it the first Chinese animated film ever to have an international theatrical release. Tianjin North Film Studio signed a deal with Cartoon Network to air the film in Australia, New Zealand, India and Taiwan, and merchandise such as a line of toys were also made.

It was announced in 2011 that an English dub of the film was in the works, with Michael Clarke Duncan, Rebecca Black, Claire Geare and Jade Lianna-Peters. Other candidates were Daniel Craig, Robert De Niro, Ralph Fiennes, Hugh Grant, Madonna, Shaquille O'Neal and Michael Tyson. It was the first-ever Chinese picture to have it be dubbed English on its North American release. The DVD of the English dub was released by Lions Gate Entertainment on September 24, 2013.

Reception
Legend of a Rabbit was a commercial flop at the Chinese box office, managing to gross CNY16.2 million against its CNY210 million budget. It had earned over CNY10 million on its first week. The film's director considered that the reason for the very little amount of viewing for cartoon movies was due to the audience's habits. However, in March 2013, it was #6 on Redbox's Family Top 20.

Many have considered the film to be a rip-off of the 2008 American film Kung Fu Panda. Reacting to this, Yijun denied that "Legend of a Rabbit" was even based on the film and said he was confused by the netizens' response.

Response of the film from critics was mixed to negative. The Hollywood Reporter said the film had "potential to be a cheeky finger-up to the Kung Fu Panda franchise", but noted the lack of "eye-popping action, incident or humor to nourish the congee-thin plot," saying that it was "sweet but not enough of a funny bunny." The Sun called it "a commendable effort. It's only fault is that it has to stand up against the technically-slick productions from Hollywood." Japancinema.net graded it a D, calling it an "unoriginal, messy, waste of time, waste of money film that hopefully I can forget as fast as I watched it." Linus Tee, writing for moviexclusive.com, criticized the film's humor and CGI quality, stating it would've been better if it had more-polished technological resources and dialogues. Writing for the magazine Starburst, Andrew Pollard named it "one of those movies that you will regret giving your time to, and it will have you thinking of all the other, better ways you could have spent ninety minutes of your day, such as chewing glass or repainting the house and then watching the walls dry", giving it three out of ten stars. On the positive side, the Dove Foundation awarded the film a score of 3 out of 5, saying that the "characters are memorable and the theme of loyalty is not to be missed in this movie!" However, they warned parents about the amount of violence in the film, suggesting it for kids at the age of 12 years or older.

Awards

Sequels
A sequel of the film, Legend of a Rabbit: The Martial of Fire came out in 2015. A sequel was first announced in November 2011. The film was sold to Turkey, Indonesia, Iran and the Middle East in February 2012, and was originally announced to be released under the title Legend of a Rabbit 2: Mysterious City Of Stones. In May 2013, it was stated that Xu Zheng would play the main character, and that the film would premiere at the Cannes Film Festival on May 19. The sequel was also to be directed by Yijun. Neither were actually involved in the final film. It released on February 21, 2015 with many citing improvements over the first film with the higher quality animation and voice acting.

An Untitled Third Film is currently in development that was scheduled for a 2017 release but not much has been said since its announcement.

References

External links

2011 computer-animated films
2011 films
Chinese computer-animated films
Animated films about rabbits and hares
Animated films about cats
Animated films about monkeys
Films with screenplays by Zou Jingzhi